Yevgeni Olegovich Matrakhov (born 10 August 1990) is a Russian professional footballer. He plays for FC Sakhalin Yuzhno-Sakhalinsk.

Club career
He made his professional debut in the Russian Second Division in 2008 for FC Zenit-2 St. Petersburg.

He made his Russian Football National League debut for FC Petrotrest Saint Petersburg on 9 July 2012 in a game against FC Ural Yekaterinburg.

External links

References

1990 births
Footballers from Saint Petersburg
Living people
Russian footballers
Association football midfielders
FC Petrotrest players
FC Vityaz Podolsk players
FC Dynamo Saint Petersburg players
FC Sakhalin Yuzhno-Sakhalinsk players
FC Rostov players
FC Sever Murmansk players
FC Zenit-2 Saint Petersburg players